NASCAR's premier racing division, the NASCAR Cup Series, has seen many close finishes since the electronic scoring system was instituted in May during the 1993 season. As of 2022, the closest margin of victory in the NASCAR Cup Series is 0.002 seconds. This first occurred during the 2003 Carolina Dodge Dealers 400 at Darlington Raceway, as Ricky Craven crossed the finish line inches ahead of Kurt Busch.

History 

Prior to the introduction of integrated electronic scoring in May 1993, margins of victory were scored in laps, car lengths, or feet, using handheld stopwatches or analog timing clocks. This occasionally led to controversy, such as occurred in the inaugural Daytona 500 in 1959. Initially, NASCAR declared the race won by Johnny Beauchamp, but many observers felt that Lee Petty had won. It took 61 hours before video evidence established Petty as the winner.

Beginning with the 1993 Save Mart Supermarkets 300K, scoring was standardized to the thousandth of a second using transponders located on the vehicles and timing lines around the track. Geoff Bodine won the first event using this electronic scoring, finishing 0.53 seconds ahead of Ernie Irvan.

Closest finishes

See also 
 Photo finish
 List of the closest NASCAR Xfinity Series finishes
 List of the closest NASCAR Truck Series finishes

Notes

References

External links 
 NASCAR NASCAR Cup Series closest finishes

Closest NASCAR Cup Series finishes
Closest NASCAR Cup Series finishes
Closest finishes
Temporal superlatives